Zagreb Commuter Rail is the suburban/commuter railway network that provides mass-transit service in the city of Zagreb, Croatia and its suburbs. This suburban rail system, introduced in 1992 on the route Savski Marof - Zagreb Main Station - Dugo Selo, is operated by Croatian Railways (HŽ) and mainly covers the eastern and western parts of Zagreb, using the M102 corridor between Dugo Selo and Zagreb Main Station and M101 corridor between Zagreb Main Station and Savski Marof.

In 2010 the route was extended by 3 more stations, Sutla, Laduč and Harmica, using the corridor L102 between Savski Marof and Harmica.

Since the system started operating, the lines have been serviced by HŽ series 6111 EMU's built by Ganz. In 2011, a prototype of a new series of EMU trains for suburban traffic of the City of Zagreb was handed over to the Croatian Railways for use by the KONČAR Group (series 6112-1 and 6 112–2; suburban version). Between 2015 and 2023, an additional 27 sets of the 6 112 series were delivered, which gradually replaced all 6 111 sets on Zagreb suburban lines.

References

Transport in Zagreb
Rail infrastructure in Croatia
Regional rail